Alexey Nikolayevich Cheskidov (b. July 14, 1977) is a Russian businessman, known as organizer of the series of amateur triathlon and marathon events in Russia (Titan in Bronnitsy, Moscow Region).

Two-time Ironman and marathoner Cheskidov was born in Tyumen, Soviet Union, and educated in the Netherlands, where he lived for eight years. He is also the owner, founder and CEO of EVEN company group (truck hydraulics manufacturer) and its subsidiaries Tachograph LLC ( - tachographs supplier) and Shaft LLC ( - truck and bus transmissions supplier).

Alexey Cheskidov has been appointed as vice-president of Russian Triathlon Federation.

References

1977 births
Living people
Russian businesspeople
People from Tyumen
Sportspeople from Tyumen Oblast
Sports businesspeople